Dianne Morales is an American nonprofit executive and politician. She was an unsuccessful candidate in the 2021 New York City mayoral election.

Early life and education 
Morales is Afro-Latina; her parents are from Puerto Rico. She was born and raised in Bedford-Stuyvesant in Brooklyn, growing up on DeKalb Avenue, and graduated from Stuyvesant High School in Manhattan in New York City. 

Morales then went on to attend Stony Brook University and earned a Master of Social Administration from the Harvard Graduate School of Education, and a Master of Education Administration from Columbia University.

Career 
While working at the New York City Department of Education, Morales helped open the Office of Youth Development and School-Community Services under Chancellor Joel Klein, and served as its Chief of Operations from 2002 to 2004. From 2004 to 2005, she served as a director of The Teaching Commission, a national task force that focuses on improving teaching quality in American schools. Morales was a founding member of Jumpstart, a national early childhood nonprofit organization. From 2005 to 2009, she served as executive director of The Door, a youth-development organization that serves over 11,000 young people every year.

Since 2010 Morales had been the executive director and CEO of Phipps Neighborhoods in the South Bronx, a Bronx social services organization that fights poverty, until she stepped down to run for mayor in 2019. She serves on the board of the NYC Human Services Council and the Community Schools Advisory Board.

In 2011, she founded the charter school Broome Street Academy.

2021 NYC Mayoral campaign

In 2019, Morales announced her candidacy for Mayor of New York City in the 2021 election. In January 2020 she quit her job to campaign full time, in her first political campaign. 

Her campaign-announced priorities include reforming the New York City Housing Authority, desegregating city schools, promoting equitable and affordable mass transit, creating green jobs, building affordable housing, a guaranteed minimum income, rent cancellation, cutting the New York Police Department budget, an elected police oversight body, and reforming the police. Morales also is looking to create a "community first responders department" to respond to non-criminal issues such as homelessness and mental health that are currently handled by the police. The New York Daily News in November 2020 described her as one of the most progressive candidates in the race. If elected, she would have become the city's first Afro-Latina mayor and its first female mayor.

In May 2021, senior staffers campaign manager Whitney Hu and senior adviser Ifeoma Ike resigned from the campaign. Four other women attempting to unionize remaining staffers were fired. The departures were preceded by allegations of racial discrimination, sexual harassment, and employee abuse. The New York Times reported on June 9, 2021: "At least four political groups, including the Working Families Party, have rescinded their endorsements, donations slowed to a crawl and her senior adviser has joined a rival campaign."

Morales finished in sixth place in the Democratic primary election held on June 22, 2021.

Personal life
Morales is a single mother and lives in Bedford-Stuyvesant with her two children and her parents.

References

External links
 Dianne Morales for NYC Mayor (campaign website)

21st-century American politicians
Candidates in the 2021 United States elections
People from Bedford–Stuyvesant, Brooklyn
Politicians from Brooklyn
Living people
Stony Brook University alumni
Teachers College, Columbia University alumni
Harvard Graduate School of Education alumni
1967 births